Westcor was a subsidiary of The Macerich Company and a large developer of shopping malls in the Southwestern region of the United States. It was founded in 1964 by entrepreneurs Rusty Lyon & Bob Teske. In 2012, Westcor was consolidated into Macerich who has continued to operate most of their properties.

Properties Developed

References

External links
Westcor Home Page

Shopping center management firms
Real estate companies established in 1964
Companies based in Phoenix, Arizona